Golabi-ye Sofla (also Romanized as Golābī-ye Soflá; also known as Golābī-ye Pā‘īn) is a village in Falard Rural District, Falard District, Lordegan County, Chaharmahal and Bakhtiari Province, Iran. At the 2006 census, its population was 26, in 6 families. The village is populated by Lurs.

References 

Populated places in Lordegan County
Luri settlements in Chaharmahal and Bakhtiari Province